Emmanuel Robert Maah (born 25 March 1985) is a French professional footballer who plays for Pétange in Luxembourg. Although he can play as a centre forward, he is usually deployed as a winger.

Career
Maah was born in Paris, and began his training with Stade Lavallois. He started his senior career in Italy with A.S. Bari in 2005, and spent the next years with various clubs in Série B and Lega Pro, with a short spell in Belgium with R.E. Mouscron. In September 2010, Maah signed a one-year contract with Como. In July 2011 he left for Cittadella.

In January 2013, CFR Cluj signed Maah from Cittadella for a reported fee of €700,000. In July 2014 he signed a two-year contract with US Orléans. He left after the first season, when Orléans were relegated, and was reported to be a target of RC Lens, AJ Auxerre and AC Ajaccio. However, within a week  he had signed a two-year deal with Turkish side Göztepe S.K.

In August 2016, Maah signed for Gazélec Ajaccio on a two-year deal with the option for a further year. However, in October 2017 he was sacked by the club for serious misconduct. He signed for US Boulogne in August 2018 for one season. After being second highest scorer in the 2018–19 Championnat National he left Boulogne and signed for the club he started with, Stade Lavallois, in July 2019.

Released by Laval at the end of the 2019–20 season, Maah joined Luxembourg side Union Titus Pétange in June 2020.

References

External links
 

1985 births
Living people
French footballers
Footballers from Paris
French sportspeople of Cameroonian descent
Association football forwards
S.S.C. Bari players
Ravenna F.C. players
S.S.D. Pro Sesto players
F.C. Grosseto S.S.D. players
Royal Excel Mouscron players
Como 1907 players
A.S. Cittadella players
CFR Cluj players
US Orléans players
Gazélec Ajaccio players
US Boulogne players
Stade Lavallois players
Union Titus Pétange players
Serie C players
Serie B players
Belgian Pro League players
Liga I players
Ligue 2 players
Championnat National players
Luxembourg National Division players
French expatriate footballers
Expatriate footballers in Italy
Expatriate footballers in Belgium
Expatriate footballers in Romania
French expatriate sportspeople in Romania